DMC Global Inc. is a metalworking business headquartered in Broomfield, Colorado. It was formed in 1971, then known as Explosive Fabricators Inc.

The company operates in two segments, explosive metalworking and perforation (oil well). The explosive metalworking segment utilizes explosives to perform  metal cladding and shock synthesis. Its principal product is an  explosion welded clad metal plate, which is used in the construction of heavy, corrosion-resistant pressure vessels, and heat exchangers for petrochemical, refining, and hydrometallurgy industries.

External links
Official site
Manufacturing companies based in Colorado
Companies based in Broomfield, Colorado
Companies listed on the Nasdaq